Ruqaya Izzidien is an Iraqi–Welsh novelist and freelance journalist. She lives in England.

Life and career

Ruqaya Izzidien grew up in rural Wales before studying Modern Languages at Durham University in 2005. As a journalist, her work has appeared in The New York Times, The Guardian, Al Jazeera English and the BBC. She has lived in Gaza, Egypt, and Morocco,  before moving to the North West of England, where she currently resides. 

In 2019, she was among six of the authors awarded the Betty Trask Awards for her debut novel The Watermelon Boys, 2018 published by Hoopoe Fiction (AUC Press).

Work 
Novels
The Watermelon Boys (Hoopoe, London 2018. .)

See also
 List of Iraqi artists
 List of Iraqi women artists

References

External links 
 Author's homepage

Iraqi women writers
Iraqi writers
Alumni of Durham University
Year of birth missing (living people)
Living people